Circles is the eighth album by the group Shooting Star. It is the first album to feature founding drummer Steve Thomas since 1985's Silent Scream; as well as the last album to feature original bassist Ron Verlin prior to his retirement from the band in 2009; and the only album to feature vocalist Kevin Chalfant and violinist Shane Michaels.

Track listing

Personnel
Van McLain – guitars, lead vocals
Kevin Chalfant – lead vocals
Dennis Laffoon – keyboards, vocals
Shane Michaels – violin
Steve Thomas – drums
Ron Verlin – bass

References

2006 albums
Shooting Star (band) albums
E1 Music albums